Lassell  is a small lunar impact crater that is located in the eastern part of the Mare Nubium. It was named after British astronomer William Lassell. It lies to the west of the crater Alpetragius and southwest of Alphonsus.

Description
The interior of Lassell has been flooded and resurfaced by lava, leaving a nearly flat surface with a low remaining outer rim. The surface has a low albedo, giving the interior a dark appearance. The surviving outer wall is generally circular but with a somewhat polygonal shape.

To the east-northeast is a circular, bowl-shaped crater designated Lassell B. This formation has a higher albedo than its surroundings and so appears relatively bright, especially at high sun angles.

The tiny crater Lassell D is located to the west-northwest of Lassell, about halfway to the ruined crater Guericke. This craterlet is surrounded by a patch of high-albedo surface, and is an example of a prominent lunar bright patch. The light hue is thought to be an indication of recent formation, at least in lunar geological terms.

Lassell massif
To the west of Lassell, at coordinates 14.65°S, 350.96°E is a small highland area called the Lassell Massif, which has a reddish color relative to the surrounding mare.

The massif was created by series of eruptions of viscous silicic lavas starting 4.07 billion years ago. Its surface is suspected to be partially buried by ejecta from Copernicus crater. The  southern domes Lassell G and Lassell K have most silica-rich composition and feature a caldera-like depressions on tops.

Satellite craters
By convention these features are identified on lunar maps by placing the letter on the side of the crater midpoint that is closest to Lassell.

References

External links

Lassell at The Moon Wiki
 
 

Impact craters on the Moon